What a Distinguished Family (Italian: Che distinta famiglia!) is a 1945 Italian "white-telephones" comedy film directed by Mario Bonnard and starring Gino Cervi, Assia Noris and Aroldo Tieri.

The film's art direction was by Gastone Medin. Due to the events of 25 July 1943, the making of the film was interrupted or temporarily suspended. The film was only released in public cinemas at the end of 1945.

Cast

References

Bibliography 
 Moliterno, Gino. Historical Dictionary of Italian Cinema. Scarecrow Press, 2008.

External links 
 

1945 films
1940s Italian-language films
Italian comedy films
1945 comedy films
Films directed by Mario Bonnard
Italian black-and-white films
1940s Italian films